Vasilisa Vasilievna Kuzmina (born on 29 November 1991 in Moscow, Russia) is a filmmaker, screenwriter and actress.

Biography

Early life 
Vasilisa born on 29 November 1991 in Moscow, Russia.

She graduated from Economics Faculty of MGIMO University and Columbia University (New York).

In 2017, she finished The Mikhail Shchepkin Higher Theater School (Dragunov's studio). Also, she is the graduate of Fyodor Bondarchuk's «Industry» Movie and Television school.

Career 
In 2017 Vasilisa Kuzmina played the leading role in the «Muse» movie, for which she was awarded an International Film Festival for Peace, Inspiration, and Equality award. She took part in the Monaco International Film Festival as jury member same year.

In 2018 her first student's project, «Free that guy» short movie, led Vasilisa to the Best Film Award at the Los Angeles Film Awards. «Alisa» movie became her debut filmmaking work, which was filmed as a part of national screenwriters competition announced by Yandex Medialab. Vasilisa became the winner and achieved a chance to put the movie script into the actual reality with Timur Bekmambetov and his Bazelevs Film Company guadiance. Later on, «Alice» became a nominee of a number of festivals, among which are: Women Media Arts and Film (2021, Sydney, Australia); Seoul international Extreme-Short Image & Film Festival (2019, Seol, Korea); Hong Hong PUFF Film Festival (2020, Hong Kong, China).

In 2020 Vasilisa together with Ivan Petukhov released 5-series sequel for the short movie. «Alisa» mini series was included in the pilot episodes competition program of the South by Southwest (SXSW) — the biggest American festival.The series premiere took place there as well.

In 2022 Vasilisa Kuzmina became a director of «Nika» biographical drama, which was telling about little poetess named Nika Turbina. Elizaveta Yankovskaya, Anna Mikhalkova and Vitaliya Kornienko played the leading roles. «Nika» movie was enlisted in the South by Southwest film festival program, where it won a special prize for breakthrough. By the special prize SXSW remarked Elizaveta Yankovskaya's acting job.

Awards and nominations

Filmography

Roles in movies 
 2017 — Muse — Muse
 2017 — Fleabag — Alina
 2018 — Two solitudes — shop assistant
 2018 — Free that guy — girl

Directing 
 2018 — Alice AI — Director
 2018 — Free that guy — Director
 2020 — Alisa — Director
 2022 — Besit (3 and 5 series) — Director
 2022 — Nika — Director

References

External links 
 

Living people
1991 births
Russian film directors
Russian screenwriters
Russian actresses